Emory Richard Johnson (March 22, 1864 – March 8, 1950) was a United States economist who specialized in transportation issues.

Biography
Johnson was born in Waupun, Wisconsin. He studied at University of Wisconsin (1888) and University of Pennsylvania (Ph.D., 1893). He was instructor of economics at Haverford College 1893-96. He became professor of transportation and commerce at the University of Pennsylvania in 1896, and was dean of its Wharton School from 1919 to 1933. He served as expert on transportation (1899) on the United States Industrial Commission, and was a member on valuation of railway property for the United States Census Bureau (1904–05), and as expert on traffic on the National Waterways Commission of 1909. In 1911 he furnished a report on Panama Canal traffic, etc., for U.S. President William Howard Taft, and in 1907 arbitrated the dispute between the Southern Pacific Company and the Order of Railroad Telegraphers. In 1926 he travelled to China; in Shandong he met the 6-year-old Duke Yansheng Kung Te-cheng and invited him to attend the University of Pennsylvania. He was director of the Bureau of Municipal Research, Philadelphia, and director of the Philadelphia Maritime Exchange. He died in Philadelphia on March 8, 1950.

Works

Inland Waterways: Their Relation to Transportation (1893)
American Railway Transportation (1903)
Elements of Transportation (1906)
Railroad Traffic and Rates (1911)
Panama Canal Traffic and Tolls (1912)
Measurement of Vessels for the Panama Canal (1913)
The Panama Canal and Commerce (1916)
Principles of Railroad Transportation (1916)
He wrote many papers on the economics of railroads, etc. He was editor of the Annals of the American Academy of Political and Social Science from 1901 to 1914.

Notes

References

1864 births
1950 deaths
People from Waupun, Wisconsin
University of Pennsylvania alumni
University of Wisconsin–Madison alumni
University of Pennsylvania faculty
Writers from Pennsylvania
Writers from Wisconsin
Economists from Wisconsin